Deadbeat  is the stage name of Scott Montieth, a Canadian electronica musician. His music often has a political focus. He uses a laptop to create his music, including live shows. Deadbeat's early albums were created in Montreal, Quebec; he currently works and lives in Berlin.

Early life
Montieth was born in Kitchener, Ontario.

Career
Living and performing in Montreal, Montieth released his first album in 2001; his next album, Wildlife Documentaries, came out a year later. Montieth then began performing with Steve Beaupré in the duo Crackhaus. In 2003 he performed at the Mutek and Sonar festivals.

In 2004, a few months after his marriage, Montieth released a third Deadbeat album, Something Borrowed, Something Blue

In 2005, while Montieth was still living in Montreal, Deadbeat released an album, New World Observer, on Pole's "~scape" label. Pop singer Athésia appeared as a guest vocalist on the album.

In 2006 Montieth moved to Berlin, Germany, and subsequently performed at a number of clubs and festivals.

In 2018, Monteith reached out to Cowboy Junkies to ask if they had any plans to commemorate the 30th anniversary of their breakthrough 1988 album The Trinity Session, which he loves, like they did with Trinity Revisited for its 20th. They told him that they didn't, but would enthusiastically support whatever angle he wanted to run with. Monteith approached musician/producer/fellow Canadian-in-Berlin Fatima Camara about working with him on this project, and she was thrilled to participate. After several meetings, they set up in Berlin's Chez Cherie studio, and made the proceedings reverent to the original by exploring the acoustic properties of the space and minimizing their arrangements to do so. This was also the first project either had done which placed so much emphasis on their singing voices. The end result, released in 2019 on 2LP/CD/download by Constellation, was Deadbeat & Camara's Trinity Thirty, a full cover of the major release of the album. One bit of fun they had was including a cover of Patsy Cline's "Walkin' After Midnight" in their version of the Junkies' original song "I Don't Get It," turning it into "I Don't Get It After Midnight (Medley)."

In 2019 Deadbeat picked his eight favorite cuts from the LNOE back catalog to rework, providing new ‘dub’ interpretations of tracks from Sasha, Hunter/Game, Ejeca, Jody Barr, VONDA7, Alex Niggemann, Jon Gurd and Dubspeeka. Last Night On Earth welcomed the prolific Deadbeat with a special vinyl ‘LNOE in Dub’ compilation, featuring a new Sasha exclusive. The DJ/producer, sound artist, and music tech educator already has an extensive resume of labels and collaborators including Echocord, Mutek, Sonar, RBMA, and Monolake.

Albums

 Primordia (2001)
 Wild Life Documentaries (2002)
 Something Borrowed, Something Blue (2004)
 New World Observer (2005)
 Journeyman's Annual (2007)
 Roots And Wire (2008)
 Drawn And Quartered (2011)
 Eight (2012)
 Walls And Dimensions (2015)
 Wax Poetic For This Our Great Resolve (2018)

References

External links
 Deadbeat discography at Discogs
 Deadbeat RBMA lecture

Living people
Musicians from Kitchener, Ontario
Canadian electronic musicians
Year of birth missing (living people)